Pototan,  is a 1st class municipality in the province of Iloilo, Philippines. According to the 2020 census, it has a population of 78,298 people.

The town has an area of 94 km2, 85% of which is agricultural land. In December 1997, it was declared as the "Christmas Capital of Western Visayas" because of its famed Christmas Festival of Lights.

Considered the rice granary of Panay, the town is bordered by Dingle to the north, Zarraga to the south, Barotac Nuevo to the east, New Lucena, Iloilo and Mina to the west.

History

Early history
The first people of Pototan were the family of Datu Ramon, grandson of Datu Puti, a Malay from the town of Dumangas. They first settled at Barangay Naslo, which was formerly the poblacion (town center). In that place was found a luxuriant growth of trees called "putat", after which the place was subsequently called "Kaputatan" or "place of many Putat trees." However, due to its hilly terrain and poor water supply, they decided to move nearer the bank of the Suage River, now called Pototan.

In the middle of the 16th century, the Chinese traders arrived in Pototan.

Spanish era

The arrival of the Spaniards in 1593 sparked new changes in the socio-economic and political life of the natives. It was the start of a new era, the natives were converted to Catholicism through the efforts of Augustinian Friars. The settlement was subsequently made into a Parish. Education, though at the onset only for the privileged few, was introduced. The name "Kaputatan", which the Spanish have difficulty pronouncing, was changed to "Pototan".

The Spanish built roads and bridges.  Don Tomas Sajen and Don Escribano supervised the construction of the Tribunal (municipal hall) with the natives contributing the labor. The Tribunal withstood World War II and in the early 50s was modified into what is now the Western Visayas Hospital.

In 1874, Pototanons began to run their own political affairs with the appointment of Don Juan Marcelo as the first Capitan Municipal. This form of government continued until the arrival of the Americans.

During the incumbency of Capitan Municipal Braulio Peñaranda in 1891, there was a cholera outbreak.

During the Philippine Revolution, Pototanons such as Teresa Magbanua (known as the Joan of arc of the Visayas) and her two brothers, Elias and Pascual Magbanua took up arms and joined the revolution.

The Americans arrived after Spain ceded Philippines to the United States in 1898. The remaining Spanish population fled to the hills together with many Filipinos including the last Gobernadorcillio, Don Maurilio Mendoza. He was later held prisoner by the Americans but subsequently named the first Municipal President.

American era
Under the Americans, the natives were granted the freedom of speech and worship. Education was liberalized; more and better roads and bridges were constructed. Improvements were also noticed in the economic, social and cultural life of the people.

During the incumbency of Mun. President Maurillo Mendoza, the Pototanons again witnessed another unforgettable event: the burning of the entire half of the poblacion in November 1914. The cause of the fire is unknown.

When the Philippine Constitution was ratified in 1935, another change in the town's local governance was introduced: the title of Municipal President was changed to Municipal Mayor. Santiago Puig was the first Municipal Mayor. He was succeeded by Mariano Peñaflorida in 1940. Peñaflorida served until September 16, 1942.

World War II
The coming of the Japanese during World War II spread chaos and fear among Pototanons. Mayor Peñaflorida continued to act as Mayor under the Free Revolutionary Government of Tomas Confesor while the Japanese Imperial Forces designated Tomas Ferrariz as Puppet Mayor.

Geography

Barangays
Pototan is politically subdivided into 50 barangays.

 Abangay
 Amamaros
 Bagacay
 Barasan
 Batuan
 Bongco
 Cahaguikican
 Callan
 Cansilayan
 Casalsagan
 Cato-ogan
 Cau-ayan
 Culob
 Danao
 Dapitan
 Dawis
 Dongsol
 Fundacion
 Guinacas
 Guibuangan
 Igang
 Intaluan
 Iwa Ilaud
 Iwa Ilaya
 Jamabalud
 Jebioc
 Lay-ahan
 Primitivo Ledesma Ward (Pob.
 Lopez Jaena Ward (Poblacion)
 Lumbo
 Macatol
 Malusgod
 Naslo
 Nabitasan
 Naga
 Nanga
 Pajo
 Palanguia
 Fernando Parcon Ward (Poblacion)
 Pitogo
 Polot-an
 Purog
 Rumbang
 San Jose Ward (Poblacion)
 Sinuagan
 Tuburan
 Tumcon Ilaya
 Tumcon Ilaud
 Ubang
 Zarrague

Climate

Demographics

Karay·a is the primary language in the municipality.

Economy

Education

Private Schools
Adventist Academy - Iloilo, Inc. (West Visayan Academy)
Colegio de la Inmaculada Concepción - Hijas de Jesús
EXEL Montessori de Pototan
First Bible Baptist Academy
Pototan Baptist Church Learning Center
Pototan Christian Learning Center
The Integrated Academy School System, Inc.

Tertiary
West Visayas State University - Pototan Campus

Secondary
Alberto Sorongon Sr. Memorial NHS
Pototan National Comprehensive HS
Jamabalud NHS
Jose Facultad Memorial NHS
Palanguia NHS

Primary

Barasan ES
Batuan ES
Cahaguikican ES 
Cansilayan ES
Casalsagan ES
Danao ES
Dapitan ES
Doña Trinidad ES
Dolores P. Tirador ES
Edmundo Dayot Memorial ES
Guibuangan ES
Guinacas ES
Igang ES
Iwa-Macatol ES
Jamabalud ES
Juana Bolivar Peñaflorida ES (Amamaros ES)
Lay-ahan ES
Lumbo ES
Maravilla ES
Matias Yusay Memorial ES
Nabitasan ES 
Naslo ES
Palanguia ES
Pototan Pilot ES
Rizal ES
San Juan ES
Sinuagan ES
Tuburan ES
Ubang ES

Government

List of chief executives

Gobernadorcillos

Capitán municipal
In 1893, the Maura Law was passed to reorganize town governments with the aim of making them more effective and autonomous. The law changed the title of chief executive of the town from gobernadorcillo to capitán municipal.

Presidentes & vice presidentes municipal

Municipal Mayors

References

External links

 [ Philippine Standard Geographic Code]
 Philippine Census Information
 Local Governance Performance Management System

Municipalities of Iloilo